Xiphophorus kosszanderi, the speckled platy, is a fish in the family Poeciliidae. It is found in Mexico. Although Fishbase lists this species as valid other authorities regard this taxon as a hybrid between Xiphophorus variatus and X. xiphidium.

References

kosszanderi
Fish described in 1981